Call Me Mister is a 1951 American Technicolor musical film released by Twentieth Century-Fox. The feature was directed by Lloyd Bacon and re-written from the 1946 Broadway play version by Albert E. Lewin and Burt Styler with music by Harold Rome that featured cast members from the US armed forces.

Call Me Mister was filmed in Technicolor, and starred Betty Grable and Dan Dailey and co-starred Danny Thomas with supporting players Dale Robertson, Benay Venuta, and Richard Boone. Only a couple Harold Rome numbers were kept in the film.

Background
Screen version of the Broadway musical Call Me Mister was one of Grable's final "successful" films as her box-office power was beginning to diminish. This was also Grable's last film with Dan Dailey, with whom she co-starred in several of her previous films. Call Me Mister was a "moderate success" at the box-office.

The finale is a production number of "Love Is Back in Business" staged by Busby Berkeley, ending with four leading players on a precarious, high-rising disc surrounded by water fountains.  Benay Venuta is replaced by a lookalike in the same clothes for this.  Asked in the 1970s about it, she explained, "Betty Grable said,  ‘I’m the star.  I gotta do it.’  Dan Dailey was so drunk he didn’t care what he was doing.  Danny Thomas said, ‘I’m on the way up.  I gotta do it.’   Well, I didn’t gotta do it."

Plot

After the end of World War II American soldiers in occupied Japan are entertained with a show put on by one of their own Sergeant Shep Dooley (Dan Dailey) and his former wife who is an entertainer Kay Hudson (Betty Grable).

Cast
 Betty Grable as Kay Hudson
 Dan Dailey as Sergeant Shep Dooley
 Danny Thomas as P.F.C. Stanley Poppoplis 
 Dale Robertson as Captain Johnny Comstock 
 Benay Venuta as Billie Barton
 Richard Boone as Mess Sergeant 
 Jeffrey Hunter as the Kid 
 Frank Fontaine as First Sergeant
 The Dunhill Trio as Dancers

Soundtrack
 Call Me Mister
 Written by Harold Rome
 Performed by chorus during credits
 Reprised by Betty Grable and Dan Dailey
 Japanese Girl Like 'Merican Boy
 Written by Sammy Fain
 Lyrics by Mack Gordon
 Sung and danced by Betty Grable and chorus
 I'm Gonna Love That Guy Like He's Never Been Loved Before
 Written by Frances Ash
 Performed by Betty Grable and male chorus
 Lament to the Pots and Pans
 Written by Earl K. Brent
 Lyrics by Jerry Seelen
 Performed by Danny Thomas
 Goin' Home Train
 Written by Harold Rome
 Performed by Bobby Short and male chorus
 I Just Can't Do Enough for You, Baby
 Written by Sammy Fain
 Lyrics by Mack Gordon
 Performed by Betty Grable and Dan Dailey
 Military Life
 Written by Harold Rome
 Revised lyrics by Jerry Seelen
 Performed by Danny Thomas
 Love is Back in Business
 Written by Sammy Fain
 Lyrics by Mack Gordon
 Performed by Betty Grable, Dan Dailey, Benay Venuta, and Danny Thomas

References

External links

 
 
 
 

1951 films
20th Century Fox films
1951 musical films
Films set in Japan
Films scored by Leigh Harline
Films directed by Lloyd Bacon
Films based on musicals
Japan in non-Japanese culture
American musical films
1950s English-language films
1950s American films